Melvin Jamon Frazier Jr. (born August 30, 1996) is an American professional basketball player for the Westchester Knicks of the NBA G League. He played college basketball for the Tulane Green Wave.

Early life
Frazier attended L. W. Higgins High School. He played AAU basketball for Team NOLA and Wings Elite, where he was a defensive force but secondary scorer to Marlain Veal. Frazier was ranked the fourth best prospect in Louisiana by The Times-Picayune as a senior. He chose Tulane over offers from Arkansas, Oklahoma and Oklahoma State.

College career
Frazier was coach Ed Conroy's highest-rated recruit but had a relatively quiet freshman season, averaging 5.2 points per game. When Mike Dunleavy Sr. arrived as coach in his sophomore season, he worked to improve Frazier's shooting mechanics and dribbling skills. Frazier averaged 11.5 points per game as a sophomore. He was named AAC player of the week for the first time on November 20, 2017. As a junior, Frazier had 10 games where he scored at least 20 points, including a career-high 28 points against Memphis. He sustaining a chest contusion early in the game against Temple on February 4 and missed a game. Frazier was named to the Second Team All-AAC as well as the Most Improved Player. He averaged 15.9 points, 5.5 rebounds, and 2.1 steals per game as a junior, while shooting 55.8 percent from the floor and 39 percent from behind the arc. After the season he declared for the 2018 NBA draft but did not immediately hire an agent. He was considered to be a borderline first round prospect. In May, Frazier signed with Thad Foucher of Wasserman Media Group, thus ending his collegiate eligibility.

Professional career
On June 21, 2018, Frazier was drafted by the Orlando Magic with the 35th overall selection in the 2018 NBA draft. On July 6, 2018, the Magic announced that they had signed Frazier.

On December 3, 2020, Frazier signed with the Oklahoma City Thunder, but was waived three days later. He joined the Oklahoma City Blue in 2021.

On February 21, 2022, Frazier was traded to the Iowa Wolves in exchange for Robert Woodard II.

On April 6, 2022, Frazier signed a two-way contract with the Oklahoma City Thunder.

For the 2022–23 season, Frazier joined Raptors 905. 

On December 28, 2022, Frazier was later traded to the Westchester Knicks in exchange for Jeremiah Tilmon.

Career statistics

NBA

Regular season

|-
| style="text-align:left;"| 
| style="text-align:left;"| Orlando
| 10 || 0 || 4.4 || .333 || .000 || .250 || .5 || .1 || .1 || .0 || 1.5
|-
| style="text-align:left;"| 
| style="text-align:left;"| Orlando
| 19 || 0 || 6.6 || .441 || .500 || .500 || .5 || .2 || .5 || .1 || 2.1
|-
| style="text-align:left;"| 
| style="text-align:left;"| Oklahoma City
| 3 || 0 || 40.0 || .271 || .048 || .714 || 4.3 || .5 || .3 || .0 || 10.7
|- class="sortbottom"
| style="text-align:center;" colspan="2"|Career
| 32 || 0 || 9.1 || .340 || .209 || .533 || .9 || .2 || .3 || .1 || 2.7

Playoffs

|-
| style="text-align:left;"| 2019
| style="text-align:left;"| Orlando
| 3 || 0 || 5.0 || .400 || – || .500 || 1.3 || .0 || .3 || .0 || 1.7

College

|-
| style="text-align:left;"| 2015–16
| style="text-align:left;"| Tulane
| 34 || 11 || 19.5 || .401 || .286 || .516 || 3.1 || .7 || .9 || .3 || 5.2
|-
| style="text-align:left;"| 2016–17
| style="text-align:left;"| Tulane
| 30 || 28 || 30.2 || .438 || .264 || .667 || 4.6 || 1.5 || 1.9 || .5 || 11.5
|-
| style="text-align:left;"| 2017–18
| style="text-align:left;"| Tulane
| 30 || 30 || 34.4 || .556 || .385 || .712 || 5.6 || 2.9 || 2.2 || .7 || 15.9
|- class="sortbottom"
| style="text-align:center;" colspan="2"| Career
| 94 || 69 || 27.7 || .481 || .312 || .653 || 4.4 || 1.7 || 1.6 || .5 || 10.6

References

External links
 
 Tulane Green Wave bio
 NBADraft.net profile

1996 births
Living people
21st-century African-American sportspeople
African-American basketball players
American expatriate basketball people in Canada
American men's basketball players
Basketball players from Louisiana
Lakeland Magic players
Oklahoma City Blue players
Oklahoma City Thunder players
Orlando Magic draft picks
Orlando Magic players
People from Marrero, Louisiana
Raptors 905 players
Small forwards
Tulane Green Wave men's basketball players